Elections were held in Calabarzon for seats in the House of Representatives of the Philippines on May 10, 2010.

The candidate with the most votes won that district's seat for the 15th Congress of the Philippines.

Summary

Batangas

1st District
Incumbent Eileen Ermita-Buhain is in her third consecutive term and is ineligible to run; her father Eduardo is her party's nominee for the seat.

Eduardo Ermita placed the result of the election under protest in the House of Representatives Electoral Tribunal.

2nd District
Hermilando Mandanas is the incumbent.

3rd District
Victoria Hernandez-Reyes is in her third consecutive term and is ineligible to run; her husband Rodrigo is her party's nominee for the seat.

The result of the election is under protest in the House of Representatives Electoral Tribunal.

4th District
Mark L. Mendoza is the incumbent.

Cavite

Cavite, the most populous province in the country according to the 2007 census, was reapportioned into seven districts from the original three. The province now has the most number of legislative districts among provinces and cities.

1st District
Joseph Emilio Abaya is the incumbent.

2nd District (Bacoor)

3rd District (Imus)

4th District (Dasmariñas)

Elpidio Barzaga, Jr. is the incumbent, originally from the old 2nd district.

5th District

6th District

7th District
Jesus Crispin Remulla is the incumbent, originally from the old third district.

Laguna

1st District
Danilo Fernandez was originally elected during the 2007 election, but the House Electoral Tribunal ruled that his residence in the district was not enough and was disqualified; no replacement was named. Fernandez is running again for the district's seat this year.

2nd District 
Justin Marc Chipeco is the incumbent.

The result of the election is under protest in the House of Representatives Electoral Tribunal.

3rd District
Maria Evita Arago is the incumbent.

4th District
Edgar San Luis is the incumbent and is running unopposed.

Quezon

1st District
Wilfrido Mark Enverga is the incumbent.

Devanadera placed the result of the election under protest in the House of Representatives Electoral Tribunal.

2nd District
Incumbent Proceso Alcala decided not to seek reelection; his son Irvin is his party's nominee for the seat.

3rd District
Danilo Suarez is the incumbent.

4th District
Incumbent Lorenzo Tañada III is running unopposed.

Rizal

1st District
Incumbent Michael John Duavit is in his third consecutive term already and is not eligible for reelection; Joel Duavit will run as his party's nominee in the district..

2nd District
Incumbent Adeline Rodriguez-Zaldarriaga is not running; Isidro Rodriguez, Jr. will run as her party's nominee in the district.

Antipolo

Antipolo is a component city of Rizal.

1st District
Roberto Puno is the incumbent.

2nd District
Incumbent Angelito Gatlabayan is running for mayor of Antipolo.

References

External links
Official website of the Commission on Elections

2010 Philippine general election
2010